The tenth election for the governorship of Bangkok took place on 3 March 2013. The election was won by incumbent governor MR Sukhumbhand Paribatra of the Democrat Party. Twenty-five candidates contested the election. Pol Gen Pongsapat Pongcharoen, representing the Pheu Thai Party, was regarded as the other major contender.

Campaign
The election was scheduled to take place sixty days after Sukhumbhand resigned on 9 January 2013, his second-to-last day of office. (Resignation, as opposed to completion of the term, effectively extended the election deadline for another fifteen days.) The Election Commission accepted registrations on 21–25 January, although unofficial campaigning had begun earlier.

The election was viewed as a sharp contest between the Democrat Party, whose candidates had held the governorship since 2004, and the Pheu Thai Party, which lead the current national government. While Bangkok is regarded as a traditional stronghold of the Democrat Party, Sukhumbhand faced low public approval ratings. Prior to endorsing Sukhumbhand, the party faced internal controversy over the candidacy. Sukhumbhand's first-term performance was generally viewed as poor, a fact some have attributed to partisan conflicts between the city and national governments. The Pheu Thai Party picked up on this dissatisfaction and campaigned on "seamless coordination" between the governments. Its candidate, Pongsapat, previously served as spokesman of the Royal Thai Police.

Candidates
The highlight of the election was also other candidates who ran independently, including:
 Police General Seripisut Temiyavet, former Commissioner-General of the Royal Thai Police and anti-corruption activist;
 Suharit Siamwala, DJ and business executive;
 Kosit Suvinitjit, former CEO of Media of Medias Co. and Spring News channel;
 Thoranee Rittheethamrong, an exorcist who revealed that she applied for candidacy "because of the Heaven's mandate" by which she has been directed to "liberate Bangkok from the authority of the Ministry of Interior and transfer this authority to its citizens";
 Jongjit Hirunlabh, environmentalist;
 Captain Metta Temchamnan, war veteran;
 Wila Udom, Chatuchak Market representative.
 Sopon Pornchokchai, real estate valuer and researcher

Results

Sukhumbhand won the election with 1,256,349 votes, or 47.75% percent of votes cast. Pongsapat won 1,077,899 votes (40.97%). Voter turnout was 63.98 percent.

References

Bangkok gubernatorial elections
Gubernatorial election,2013
2013 elections in Asia
2013 elections in Thailand
2013 in Bangkok
2013 in Thailand
March 2013 events in Thailand